The 1902 Metropolitan Rugby Union season was the 29th season of the Sydney Rugby Premiership. It was the third season run for clubs that represented a district. Eight clubs (seven representing a district, the remaining club representing Sydney University) competed from May till August 1902. The season culminated in the third district premiership, which was won by Western Suburbs. Western Suburbs were crowned premiers by virtue of finishing the season on top of the table.

Teams 
Eight clubs contested the season; seven clubs representing a district and one club representing Sydney University.

Season Summary 
The 1902 Sydney Rugby Premiership saw a popular win for the Western Suburbs District Football Club. The club had experienced the unfortunate and sad loss of their captain, William Shortland, at the end of the previous season. During the season, the team recovered from this huge loss to display improvement in defence, with only 4 tries scored against them over the final 7 rounds. Three-Quarter, Stanley Wickham demonstrated the importance of having a great goal kicker in the team, scoring 11 field goals during the season with 5 scored in one game against South Sydney.

Glebe opened the season in magnificent form defeating the two teams that eventually finished above them on the ladder. However, as the season progressed the team was required to shift players around due to injuries to important members of the team. As a result, over the final four rounds Glebe drew with North Sydney, drew with Western Suburbs and lost the penultimate match to University 6 to 4. This meant that they were out of contention for the premiership in the final round.

The final round of the season had been originally scheduled for 26 July and was postponed to the end of August due to heavy and persistent rain. This meant that for the last round of games for the season, the two teams in contention for the premiership would face each other in a "final". In order that representatives in both teams be able to depart on time for the intercolonial matches in Queensland, the game was scheduled for Wednesday, 27 August at 2pm. Again rain interfered with the quality of the game which resulted in Western Suburbs winning against Sydney University 4 points to 3.

At the conclusion of the season, the rugby world lost another significant player with the death of former University captain Horace Jones. Jones had previously captained the NSW team in intercolonial matches and had retired from rugby at the end of the 1901 season due to ill health. His cause of death was sarcoma, a soft tissue cancer.

Ladder

Ladder Progression 

 Numbers highlighted in blue indicates the team finished first on the ladder in that round.
 Numbers highlighted in red indicates the team finished in last place on the ladder in that round

Statistics

Points

Tries

Lower Grades 
The MRFU also conducted Second Grade and Boroughs competitions this season.

Second Grade 
The eight First grade clubs entered a team each into the Second Grade competition. The season concluded with a final game between Glebe and Eastern Suburbs that was practically a final. The game ended in a draw. However, Glebe were declared premiers as they were one point ahead of Eastern Suburbs on the ladder.

Boroughs Competition 
Sixteen teams participated in the first Boroughs Competition. This was a competition for teams that did not necessarily represent a district. Non-district teams acted as a feeder club for the larger district teams. These teams were: Manly, Glebe, Gipps, Willoughby, Surry Hills, Rockdale, Balmain, Newtown, Leichhardt, Burwood, Marrickville, University, Annandale, North Sydney, Mosman and Parramatta. At the conclusion of the season, Manly sat undefeated at the top of the table and were thus declared Premiers.

Participating Clubs

Footnotes

References

 Sydney Club Rugby History.
"Rugby Football Notes". Referee (Sydney, NSW: 1886 - 1939). 1902-09-03. p. 8.

1902 in Australian sport
1902 in rugby union
Rugby union competitions in New South Wales